Behnoosh Tabatabaei (born ) is an Iranian actress. She has received various accolades, including a Hafez Award. She earned a Crystal Simorgh nomination for her performance in Midday Adventure: Trace of Blood (2019).

Early life 
She has studied computer engineering and a short term of acting at University of Tehran.

Personal life 

She met actor Mahdi Pakdel in 2007, and married him in March 2011. They divorced in 2016.

Filmography

Film

Web

Television

Awards and nominations

References

External links

Behnoosh Tabatabaei at Sureh cinema centre
Behnoosh Tabatabaei in Simin story(film)
Behnoosh Tabatabaei in Mikaeel(TV serial)

1981 births
Living people
People from Tehran
Actresses from Tehran
Iranian film actresses
Iranian stage actresses
University of Tehran alumni
Iranian television actresses